Dylan Smith, who performs as Dylan J (previously Dylan Joel), is an Australian musician, singer, and rapper from Melbourne. He first gained recognition by uploading his songs to Triple J Unearthed. He later signed a deal with Warner Music Australia. He has toured nationally with Bliss n Eso in 2017 and toured internationally with up and coming artist Ruel for most of 2018 Dylan Joel has also toured with NF for his "The Search' world tour throughout 2020.

Discography

Albums

Extended plays

Singles

Awards and nominations

Music Victoria Awards
The Music Victoria Awards are an annual awards night celebrating Victorian music. They commenced in 2006.

! 
|-
| Music Victoria Awards of 2016
| Authentic Lemonade
| Best Hip Hop Album
| 
|rowspan="1"| 
|-

References

External links
https://www.facebook.com/DylanJoel/

Australian musicians
Living people
1991 births